The 2012 Sun Belt Conference men's basketball tournament was held in Hot Springs, Arkansas from March 3 to March 6 at the Summit Arena and the Convention Center Court.  Eleven Sun Belt teams participated in the tournament with seedings based on their conference record.  Louisiana-Monroe did not compete in the 2012 Sun Belt Tournament due to failing to meet the NCAA's Academic Progress Rate requirements. This was Denver's final year in the Sun Belt due to the move to the Western Athletic Conference for the 2012–13 basketball season.  The tournament winner received an automatic bid into the 2012 NCAA tournament.

Format
All teams except Louisiana-Monroe qualified for the 2012 Sun Belt Men's Basketball Tournament. The championship game was broadcast on ESPN2.

Bracket

References

External links
 2012 Sun Belt Basketball Championship Central

Sun Belt Conference men's basketball tournament
Tournament
Sun Belt Conference men's basketball tournament
Sun Belt Conference men's basketball tournament